Sierosławice may refer to the following places:
Sierosławice, Lesser Poland Voivodeship (south Poland)
Sierosławice, Lubusz Voivodeship (west Poland)
Sierosławice, Świętokrzyskie Voivodeship (south-central Poland)
Sierosławice, Opole Voivodeship (south-west Poland)